Aled Jones,  (born 29 December 1970) is a Welsh singer and radio and television presenter. As a teenage chorister, he reached widespread fame during the mid-1980s. Since then he has worked in television with the BBC and ITV, and radio (for Classic FM).

In September 2012, Jones joined ITV Breakfast where he presented Daybreak (2012–2014), alongside Lorraine Kelly and Kate Garraway.

For the BBC, he has presented Songs of Praise (since 2004), Cash in the Attic (2010–2012), Escape to the Country (2010–2013), and Going Back Giving Back (since 2016).

Early singing career
Jones was born in St. David's Hospital in Bangor, Caernarfonshire, the only child of Nest Rowlands, a teacher, and Derek John Jones, a draughtsman for a shipbuilder. He was raised in the small Welsh-speaking community of Llandegfan on Anglesey, and attended Ysgol David Hughes (a secondary school). Jones joined the choir of Bangor Cathedral at age nine and was lead soloist within two years, although he was never Head Chorister. The remarkable quality of Jones' treble voice was appreciated by a member of the congregation, Hefina Orwig Evans, who wrote a letter to record company Sain, and he was duly signed. In 1982, Jones won the Cerdd Dant solo competitions for competitors under 12 at the Urdd Eisteddfod.

Jones became famous for the cover version of "Walking in the Air", the song from Channel 4's animated film The Snowman, based on the book by Raymond Briggs. The record reached number five in the UK charts in 1985.  Although it is often reported that Jones sang the version used in the 1982 film, that was actually performed by Peter Auty, a St Paul's Cathedral choirboy.

In June 1985, Jones was the subject of an Emmy Award–winning BBC Omnibus documentary entitled The Treble. Jones, with the National Philharmonic Orchestra, was behind the Santa Claus The Movie, original motion picture soundtrack, Every Christmas Eve of 1985. Also in 1985, Jones was called by Mike Oldfield to sing on Oldfield's single "Pictures in the Dark", a three-voice song, on which he performed with Anita Hegerland and Barry Palmer, and which became fairly popular. In 1986, he sang the theme song for the Siriol Animation film A Winter Story. The song was a modest success, reaching number 51 in the UK Singles Chart.

Jones' recording career was temporarily halted when his voice broke at 16. By then he had recorded 16 albums, sold more than six million copies, and sung for Pope John Paul II, the Queen, and the Prince and Princess of Wales in a private recital, as well as presenting numerous children's television programmes. He sang at the wedding of celebrities Bob Geldof and Paula Yates in 1986. Jones also had the distinction of being the first artist to have two classical albums listed simultaneously in the popular music charts, and worked with Leonard Bernstein (Chichester Psalms). In 1986, he sang the oratorio Athalia with Emma Kirkby.

Jones' first biography, Walking on Air, was published in 1986.

Since 1990

In September 1990, Jones made his acting debut at the Royal Theatre (Northampton) in Shaun McKenna's adaptation of Richard Llewellyn's How Green Was My Valley playing the teenage Huw Morgan.

Jones went on to study at the Royal Academy of Music and the Bristol Old Vic Theatre School, before beginning his adult recording career which has featured a largely religious/inspirational repertoire. In 1995 he took the leading role in the long-running production of Andrew Lloyd Webber's Joseph and the Amazing Technicolour Dreamcoat at the Blackpool Wintergardens Opera house stage. From September 1996 to May 1997 Jones played the young Tom Gradgrind (a non-singing role) in a large-scale national touring production of Charles Dickens's Hard Times. Theatres at which the play was presented included Theatre Royal, Brighton, Bath Theatre Royal and Richmond Theatre.

In 2005, Jones launched his autobiography, Aled: The Autobiography, written in collaboration with Darren Henley. In 2013, Jones released his extended autobiography, Aled Jones: My Story.

Following the launch of his first baritone album, Aled on the Universal Music label in Australia in May 2003, Jones visited the country on a promotional tour. He has since successfully toured in concert there five times: in  Dec 2003, Aug 2006, Oct 2008, Aug/Sep 2010 and Feb 2015, performing in eight cities.

Jones has released two singles with Terry Wogan in aid of the Children in Need appeal.

From 3 July to 30 August 2008, Jones played the lead role of Caractacus Potts in Chitty Chitty Bang Bang at the Wales Millennium Centre, Cardiff. He returned to the stage, playing Bob Wallace in White Christmas at the Theatre Royal, Plymouth, and at The Lowry, Salford Quays, from November 2009 until 9 January 2010, and again from 11 to 26 November 2011 at the Mayflower Theatre, Southampton, from 1 to 17 December at the Grand Canal Theatre, Dublin, and at the Empire Theatre, Liverpool (22 December 2011 to 7 January 2012)  On 8 November 2014 Jones made his West End debut, again playing Bob Wallace in "White Christmas", this time at the Dominion Theatre, Tottenham Court Road.

Following the publication of Aled's Forty Favourite Hymns in 2009, a further book, Favourite Christmas Carols, was published on 28 October 2010; Jones took the book on his UK tour in November and December 2010. On 29 November, his CD, Aled's Christmas Gift, was issued to accompany the book.

On 11 October 2010, Jones was confirmed to take over as stand-in presenter of the early morning breakfast slot on BBC Radio 2 following the departure of Sarah Kennedy, a role he occasionally covered in the years leading up to her departure. Jones covered this slot for six weeks until the beginning of his UK tour.

Jones is mentoring  Isabel Suckling, the youngest classical recording artist signed by Decca Records and first choirgirl to sign a record contract with a major music label. Suckling's debut album was strongly endorsed by Jones, who described it as "breathtaking" and it was released on 29 November 2010.

In 2011, Jones hosted the television and DVD series, Classical Destinations III, Aled Jones' Ultimate Travel Guide to Classical Music which was filmed on his travels in the UK, Europe, Scandinavia and Australia.

Broadcasting

Radio
Jones is a presenter on Classic FM. In 2006 he joined the BBC, taking over from Don Maclean on Good Morning Sunday on BBC Radio 2. He was also a presenter of Friday Night is Music Night, and has also been a regular stand-in presenter for Sarah Kennedy and Ken Bruce on Radio 2, until he left Radio 2 in 2012. Jones also presents programmes for BBC Radio 3, such as Choir of the Year and Young Chorister of the Year and The Choir until he left Radio 3 in 2013. On 4 February 2013 it was announced that Jones had returned to Classic FM to present a new show from 9:00–12:00 on Sundays, starting on 3 March of the same year. From March 2016, his breakfast show was moved down to two hours, to 7:00–10:00 (but staying on Sundays). His show reaches over a million listeners, which is a record number for weekend breakfast listenership, alongside the Saturday show at the same slot with Alan Titchmarsh.

Television

As a teenager Jones presented Chatterbox, a children's chat show made by HTV for ITV, in 1988.

He was the subject of This Is Your Life in 2003 when he was surprised by Michael Aspel at the Royal Albert Hall in London.

Jones's appearance as a contestant on Strictly Come Dancing in 2004 brought him to the attention of a wider audience, leading to further tours and albums. It also led to increasing demands on him as a broadcaster.

Jones is one of the main presenters of  BBC One's  Songs of Praise, including the annual "Big Sing", the 50th Anniversary edition from Alexandra Palace in 2011 and the 60th Anniversary edition from Westminster Abbey (3/10/21). Since 2009, Jones has presented editions of Escape to the Country for the BBC. He was also a presenter on Cash in the Attic between 2010 and 2012. In October 2011, he appeared as a guest presenter on The One Show. In 2012, Jones hosted the Australian TV series Classical Destinations III, Aled Jones' Ultimate Travel Guide to Classical Music.

On 4 May 2012, Jones was confirmed as the  new presenter of the ITV Breakfast programme Daybreak with Lorraine Kelly and Kate Garraway, replacing Adrian Chiles. On 3 March 2014, it was announced that Daybreak was to be replaced by a new breakfast programme called Good Morning Britain, which Jones would not be a part of. His last episode aired on 25 April 2014. The following day, Jones began hosting  Weekend,  broadcast every Saturday and Sunday morning from 8:30am.

Since 2012, Jones has presented the annual Christmas Carols on ITV programme, which airs late on Christmas Eve. In 2015, he was a regular reporter for Strictly Come Dancing: It Takes Two, broadcast on BBC Two.

Since February 2016, Jones has co-presented the daily magazine show Too Much TV, for BBC Two.

Since 2016, Jones has presented Going Back Giving Back, a daytime programme for BBC One.

Jones has been on the judging panel for the Pride of Britain awards twice.

In 2022, Jones appeared on the third series of The Masked Singer as "Traffic Cone".

BBC suspension
In November 2017, Jones was being investigated by the BBC following allegations of inappropriate behaviour. In the interim, he had agreed to withdraw from programmes. It was subsequently confirmed in January 2018 that the BBC had lifted the suspension and that he would resume presenting programmes.

2018–present: Collaborations with Russell Watson
On 9 November 2018, Jones released In Harmony, a collaboration album with British tenor Russell Watson. They followed on 1 November 2019 with Back in Harmony, which debuted at number 1 on the UK Classical Albums chart.

On 4 November 2022, Jones and Watson released the album Christmas with Aled and Russell. The album debuted at number 1 on the Classical Artists Albums Chart and number 14 on the main albums chart. The album was preceded by two singles; the first, "A Spaceman Came Travelling", was released on 21 October 2022. The second single, "O Holy Night", was released on 4 November 2022. The duo toured the UK in November and December 2022.

Personal life
Jones met English circus performer Claire Fossett whilst both performed in Joseph And The Amazing Technicolour Dreamcoat in Blackpool, Lancashire. The couple married on 6 January 2001 in Covent Garden, London.

The couple have two children, actress and singer Emilia and a son Lucas. Emilia's acting credits include playing Ruby Rossi in the 2021 Sundance hit CODA, distributed by Apple TV+, garnering critical acclaim for her performance.

Jones is a practising Christian and has stated that he would not be able to present the BBC religious series Songs of Praise unless he was a Christian.

Awards and honours
On 28 October 2009, Jones was presented with a BASCA Gold Badge Award  in recognition of his unique contribution to music.

Jones was appointed Member of the Order of the British Empire (MBE) in the 2013 Birthday Honours for services to music and broadcasting and for charitable services. He collected his award on 17 October 2013.

On 14 February 2014, Jones was nominated as an Honorary Fellow of the Royal Academy of Music; he was presented with the fellowship on 3 July 2014.

Discography

Studio albums

Diolch â Chân (1983)
Ave Maria (1984)
Voices from the Holy Land (1985), also on VHS
All Through The Night (1985), UK No. 2
Carols for Christmas (Christmas Album) (1985), also on DVD
Faure: Requiem Bernstein: Chichester Psalms (1986)
Where E'er You Walk (1986) UK No. 36
Pie Jesu (1986) UK No. 25
An Album of Hymns (1986) UK No. 18
Handel: Athalia (1986)
Sailing (1987)
From the Heart (2000), as a tenor
Aled (2002) UK No. 27, AUS No.13
Hear My Prayer (2003), as boy soprano
Higher (2003) UK No. 21, AUS No.43
The Christmas Album (2004) UK No. 28
A Journey with Aled Jones (2005)
New Horizons (2005) UK No. 21, AUS No.83
Reason to Believe (2007)
Aled's Christmas Gift (2010)
Forever (2011)
The Heart of It All (2014)
One Voice (2016) UK No. 3
One Voice at Christmas (2016) UK No. 22
One Voice: Believe (2017) UK No. 17
In Harmony (2018, with Russell Watson) UK No. 8
Back in Harmony (2019, with Russell Watson) UK No. 7
Christmas with Aled and Russell (2022, with Russell Watson) UK No. 14

Singles
"Ave Maria" (1985)
"Memory" (from the musical Cats, 1985) UK No. 42
"Too Young to Know" (1985)
"Walking in the Air" (1985) UK No. 5
"Pictures in the Dark" (with Mike Oldfield) (1985) UK No. 50
"Morning Has Broken" (1986)
"A Winter Story" (1986) UK No. 51
"I'm in This Over My Head" (1998)
"Some Kind of Wonderful" (duet with Cerys Matthews) (10 October 2007)
"Little Drummer Boy" (with Terry Wogan) (2008) UK No. 3
"Silver Bells" (with Terry Wogan) (2009)
"A Spaceman Came Travelling" (with Russell Watson) (2022)
"O Holy Night" (with Russell Watson) (2022)

Talking books
The Story of Classical Music (2004)
Famous Composers (2005)
The Story of Jesus (2006)

Videos
Aled Jones – New Born King – A Festival Of Carols From London's Westminster Cathedral  (1992)
Voices From The Holy Land (1985)
Aled Jones – Carols For Christmas

DVDs
The Little Prince featuring Aled Jones (2004)
The Metropolitan Museum of Art: Carols for Christmas  (2004)
Aled Jones – Christmas Carols (2008)

Filmography
Television

Guest appearances
This Morning (8 December 2010, 31 August 2012)
Loose Women (5 October 2011, 29 March 15 October 2012)
The Alan Titchmarsh Show (19 September 2012)
The Paul O'Grady Show (24 March 2005, 22 November 2013)
Room 101 (21 February 2014)
The Guess List (26 April 2014)
TV OD (26 June 2014)
Let's Do Christmas with Gino & Mel (16 December 2014)
Michael McIntyre's Big Show (December 2016)

Film

References

External links
Aled Jones on Classic FM (Classic FM)

On Play it Again

1970 births
Living people
Welsh-language singers
BBC Radio 3 presenters
BBC Radio 2 presenters
BBC Radio Wales presenters
Boy sopranos
British performers of Christian music
Classical music radio presenters
ITV Breakfast presenters and reporters
Members of the Order of the British Empire
Opera crossover singers
People educated at Ysgol David Hughes
People from Anglesey
Welsh tenors
Welsh child singers
Welsh Anglicans
21st-century Welsh male singers
Welsh radio DJs
Welsh radio presenters
Welsh television presenters
20th-century Welsh male singers